A golden jubilee marks a 50th anniversary. It variously is applied to people, events, and nations.

Bangladesh 

In Bangladesh, golden jubilee refers the 50th anniversary year of the separation from Pakistan and is called in Bengali "সুবর্ণ জয়ন্তী" (Shuborno jayanti). Vision 2021  was the political manifesto of the Bangladesh Awami League party before winning the National Elections of 2008. It stands as a political vision of Bangladesh for the year 2021, the golden jubilee of the nation. Several celebration programs will be held in countries including India, Russia, Germany, Sweden, Hungary, Poland, Nepal and Bhutan.

China 
Emperor Wu of Han dynasty (141-87 BCE, Jubilee in 91 BCE)
Kangxi Emperor of Qing dynasty (1661–1722, Jubilee in 1711)
Qianlong Emperor of Qing dynasty (1735–1796, Jubilee in 1785)

Korea 
Yeongjo of Joseon (1724-1776, Jubilee in 1774)

Japan 
In Japan, golden jubilee refers to the 50th anniversary and is called . Emperor Hirohito (or Emperor Shōwa), celebrated his golden jubilee on 10 November 1976. Showa Memorial Park was established as part of a project to commemorate his golden jubilee.

Singapore

 For the year 2015, the "Singapore50" initiative was launched in Singapore to celebrate 50 years of independence from Malaysia, with a logo that spells "SG50". The term SG50 has since been used to refer to the celebrations as a whole. National Day Parade ceremonies for that year were themed Majulah Singapura – Our Golden Jubilee.

Thailand 
The golden jubilee is a royal ceremony to celebrate the 50th anniversary of the accession of the king. The Thai word is kanchanaphisek (กาญจนาภิเษก). The first Golden Jubilee of Thailand was the celebration of King Bhumibol Adulyadej.

The celebration
King Rama IX celebrated his golden jubilee on 9 June 1996, having acceded to the throne in 1946. He was Thailand's longest-reigning monarch.

The 545.65 carat Golden Jubilee Diamond was purchased by Thai businessmen as a gift for the king on the 50th anniversary of his coronation. The diamond is held in the Royal Palace as part of Thailand's crown jewels.

In 1996, Prime Minister Banharn Silpa-archa and the Thai people celebrated the king with a multi-day celebration.

The symbol of the golden jubilee
The symbol of the golden jubilee of King Bhumibol Adulyadej was designed by Wiyada Charoensuk, winner of a design contest.

There are three elements to the design:
The king's throne (in center) is a sign of the Chakri dynasty (the dynasty of King Bhumibhol)
White tiered umbrellas of kingship, representing the constitution of Thailand
Two elephants, representing the Thai people

The Fine Arts Department wanted this design to:
Celebrate the king
Help Thai people remember Thailand's traditions
Show that Thais are proud to be subjects of the king
Show that Thais have a long history as a nation

United Kingdom and other Commonwealth realms 
In the United Kingdom and other Commonwealth realms, a golden jubilee celebration is held in the 50th year of a monarch's reign.

For King George III 

The golden jubilee of King George III was celebrated on 25 October 1809, prior to the actual 50th anniversary in 1810.

For Queen Victoria 

In 1887 the United Kingdom and the British Empire celebrated Queen Victoria's golden jubilee. Victoria marked 20 June 1887—the fiftieth anniversary of her accession—with a banquet, to which fifty European kings and princes were invited. Although she could not have been aware of it, there was a plan by Irish Republicans to blow up Westminster Abbey while the Queen attended a service of thanksgiving. This assassination attempt, when it was discovered, became known as the Jubilee Plot. At the time, Victoria was an extremely popular monarch.

For Queen Elizabeth II 

Queen Elizabeth II celebrated her golden jubilee in 2002, having ascended the throne in 1952.

In other countries 
 Brunei, Abdul Jalilul Akbar celebrated his golden jubilee in 1648.
 Brunei, Omar Ali Saifuddin I celebrated his golden jubilee in 1790.
 Bavaria, Charles Theodore, Elector of Bavaria celebrated his golden jubilee as Elector Palatine in 1792.
 Saxe-Weimar-Eisenach, Grand Duke Karl August celebrated his golden jubilee in 1826, dating from when he reached his majority.
 Austria-Hungary, Emperor Franz Josef celebrated his golden jubilee in 1898.
 Baden, Grand Duke Frederick I celebrated his golden jubilee in 1906, dated from when he became regent to his brother before succeeding to the throne.
 Liechtenstein, Prince Johann II celebrated his golden jubilee in 1908.
 Greece, King George I was assassinated mere weeks before his golden jubilee was due to be celebrated in 1913.
 Montenegro, Nikola I Petrović-Njegoš celebrated his golden jubilee in 1914.
 Norway, King Haakon VII celebrated his golden jubilee in 1955.
 Burundi, King Mwambutsa IV Bangiriceng celebrated his golden jubilee in 1965.
 Ethiopia, Emperor Haile Selassie celebrated his golden jubilee, dating from when he became regent, in 1966.
 Iran, Naser al-Din Shah Qajar was assassinated and killed while visiting a holy place around Tehran as a religious ceremony and preparing to celebrate the 50th anniversary of his monarchy. (In Lunar Calendar)
 Iran, Shah Mohammad Reza Pahlavi celebrated the 50th anniversary of Pahlavi Dynasty in 1976.
 Japan, Emperor Showa celebrated his golden jubilee in 1976.
 Monaco, Prince Rainier III celebrated his golden jubilee in 1999.
 His Highness the Aga Khan IV celebrated his Golden Jubilee from July 11, 2007, to December 13, 2008.
 Malaysia, Sultan Tuanku Abdul Halim Muadzam Shah celebrated his golden jubilee on 15 July 2008 after 50 years  reigning the state of Kedah.
 Egypt, the Egyptian Television celebrated its  golden jubilee on 22 July 2010 after 50 years from airing for the first time.
 Kenya, the Nation Media Group's Daily Nation and Sunday Nation celebrated their golden jubilee in the year 2010 after 50 years from being published for the first time. (Sunday Nation - March 1960; Daily Nation - October 1960)
In New Zealand, Kingseat Hospital celebrated 50 years of operation in 1982., and Maeroa Intermediate in 2004.
 Detroit, Michigan in the United States, the 1946 Automotive Golden Jubilee was a citywide celebration of the fiftieth anniversary of the American automotive industry.
 Alhaji (Dr.) Ado Bayero The Emir of Kano, Nigeria celebrated his Golden Jubilee in June 2013.
 Brunei, Sultan Haji Hassanal Bolkiah celebrated his Golden Jubilee on 5 October 2017 after 50 years of his accession to the throne.
 Denmark, Queen Margrethe II celebrated her Golden Jubilee on 14 January 2022, marking the 50th anniversary of her accession to the throne.
Sharjah (United Arab Emirates), Sultan bin Mohamed Al-Qassimi III celebrated the 50th anniversary of his accession to the throne on 25 January 2022.

List of golden jubilees

See also 

 Hierarchy of precious substances
 List of longest-reigning monarchs
 Wedding anniversary

References

Anniversaries
 
50 (number)